Classmates (Swedish: Klasskamrater) is a 1952 Swedish comedy film directed by Schamyl Bauman and starring Sickan Carlsson, Olof Winnerstrand and Stig Olin. It was shot at the Centrumateljéerna Studios in Stockholm. The film's sets were designed by the art director Arthur Spjuth.

Cast
 Sickan Carlsson as Anna-Greta Wallin
 Olof Winnerstrand as Carl-Otto Johansson, principal
 Stig Olin as Stig Andersson
 Karl-Arne Holmsten as 	Anders Björk
 Hjördis Petterson as 	Wilma Pettersson
  Pia Skoglund as 	Barbro Larsson
 Jan Molander as Sixten Törnqvist
 Rune Carlsten as 	Mauritz Stolpe
 John Botvid as 	Gustafsson
 Amy Jelf as 	Maj-Britt, student
 Tommy Nilson as 	Drinking student 
 Hilma Barcklind as 	Lärarinna 
 Sickan Castegren as 	Lärarinna 
 Karin Hilke as 	Stig's hostess 
 Sven Holmberg as Journalist 
 Maritta Marke as 	Anna-Greta's hostess 
 Aurore Palmgren as 	Angry disturbed old lady 
 Hanny Schedin as 	Hulda 
 Curt 'Minimal' Åström as 	Pressfotograf

References

Bibliography 
 Per Olov Qvist & Peter von Bagh. Guide to the Cinema of Sweden and Finland. Greenwood Publishing Group, 2000.

External links 
 

1952 films
1952 comedy films
Swedish comedy films
1950s Swedish-language films
Films directed by Schamyl Bauman
1950s Swedish films